The  is a 2-laned national expressway in Hokkaidō, Japan. It is owned and operated by East Nippon Expressway Company.

Overview

The expressway is connects the east of Hokkaidō with central regions including the greater Sapporo urban area.

At Honbetsu Junction near the eastern end the expressway splits into two routes: one route heading east towards the city of Kushiro and another route heading north towards the city of Kitami.  All future extensions of these two routes will be constructed according to the New Direct Control System and are expected to operate toll-free upon completion.

The expressway is among the least used in Japan. At the time of its opening it was used by an average of only 650 vehicles a day, the lowest among all national expressways in Japan. As of 2006 the average daily ridership of the expressway has increased to 4,751 vehicles (for comparison the figure for the Tōhoku Expressway is 270,546 vehicles).

The speed limit is 70 km/h for the entire route.

List of interchanges and features

 IC - interchange, JCT - junction, SA - service area, PA - parking area, TN - tunnel, TB - toll gate

Kushiro Route

Kitami Route

History

October 30, 1995 - Tokachi Shimizu Interchange - Ikeda Interchange section opened.
October 7, 1999 - Chitose-Eniwa Junction - Yūbari Interchange section opened.
March 15, 2003 - Obihiro Junction is opened, connecting with the Obihiro-Hiroo Expressway.
June 8, 2003 - Ikeda Interchange - Honbetsu Interchange section and Honbetsu Junction - Ashoro Interchange section opened.
October 21, 2007 - Tomamu Interchange - Tokachi Shimizu Interchange section opened.
October 24, 2009 - Shimukappu Interchange - Tomamu Interchange section opened.
November 21, 2009 - Honbetsu Interchange - Urahoro Interchange section opened.
October 29, 2011 - Yubari Interchange - Shimukappu Interchange section opened.
March 29, 2015 - Urahoro Interchange - Shiranuka Interchange section opened.
March 12, 2016 - Shiranuka Interchange - Akan Interchange section opened.

See also
 Dō-Ō Expressway, another road on the island

References

External links
 East Nippon Expressway Company

Expressways in Japan
Proposed roads in Japan
Roads in Hokkaido